Chrysoesthia heringi is a moth of the family Gelechiidae. It is found in Japan.

The wingspan is 7-8.5 mm.

References

Moths described in 1961
Chrysoesthia